Kent Auburn McCloughan (born February 12, 1940) is a former football player and scout. He played cornerback for the American Football League (AFL)'s Oakland Raiders from 1965 through 1969, and for the National Football League (NFL)'s Raiders in 1970, but his career ended early because of a devastating knee injury.

With Willie Brown, a member of the Pro Football Hall of Fame, he is considered to be the originator or one of the earliest proficient exponents of Bump and run coverage, by which a defensive back impedes progress of the wide receiver by body contact, a style that was followed by later Oakland cornerbacks, such as Lester Hayes. The strategy appeared so successful in the eyes of NFL rule-makers that, to help the offense, the rules were changed in 1974, 1977, and 1978, with each rule change favoring the receiver over the defender (see Penalty (American football).) 

In 1974, the most severe rule change regarding pass receivers and defenders was enacted. This rule stipulated that a player could only make contact one time beyond 3 yards of the line of scrimmage. 

In 1977, the rule was amended to aid the pass receivers yet again. Starting that season, a defender could only make contact with a receiver one time overall, whether it be within 3 yards of the line of scrimmage or further downfield. 

In 1978, the rule was amended to aid the pass receivers yet again. Starting that season, a defender could make contact with a receiver only one time, and within 5 yards of the line of scrimmage. If the defender made contact with a receiver 6 yards or more from the line of scrimmage, it was now considered pass interference, even if the ball was not yet in the air.

A native of Broken Bow, Nebraska, McCloughan established a Nebraska state record (21.4 sec) in the 220 yard dash in 1961, which stood until Kenzo Cotton broke it in 2012.

Personal
McCloughan has three sons; Dave who played defensive back in the NFL from 1991 to 1994, Mark McCloughan and Scot, who is the former general manager of the Washington Redskins.

See also
Other American Football League players

References

1940 births
Living people
People from Scotts Bluff County, Nebraska
Players of American football from Nebraska
American football cornerbacks
Nebraska Cornhuskers football players
Oakland Raiders players
American Football League All-Star players
American Football League players
People from Broken Bow, Nebraska